Raise High is Radio America's second full-length album. The title of the record is said to have been taken from the J.D. Salinger novel Raise High the Roof Beam, Carpenters and Seymour: An Introduction.

Track listing
"Letter From a Libertine"
"Mahabharata"
"Courtesy of the Red, White & Blue"
"Boston Garden"
"Aim High in Steering"
"I Want to Go Home With You"
"It's Time You Paid For Your Crimes Against Humanity"
"(Raise) Higher"
"Credit Card Song"

Personnel
Thomas Stuart - lead vocals, guitar
Jesse Reno - lead vocals, bass guitar, acoustic guitar on "Credit Card Song"
Jason Aubin - drums

with
Tintern - producer

External links
Raise High on CD Baby
Raise High on iTunes

2006 albums
Radio America (band) albums